WPAP may refer to:

 Web Proxy Autodiscovery Protocol
 WPAP (FM), a radio station (92.5 FM) licensed to Panama City, Florida, United States